Becky Duval Reese is an American curator and art museum director. She is best known for her work as the director of the El Paso Museum of Art (EPMA) and oversaw the museum's move in 1998. She was inducted into the El Paso Women's Hall of Fame in 2005.

Biography 
Duval Reese attended New Mexico State University (NMSU) for both her bachelor and master of arts degrees. She went on to become the director of the Las Cruces Art Learning Center and later, the director of the Williams Gallery at NMSU. After NMSU, she became the educational curator of the University of Texas Huntington Art Gallery where she stayed for 15 years.

Duval Reese moved to El Paso in 1991 order to become the director of the El Paso Museum of Art (EPMA). In 1998, she oversaw the move of EPMA from its old location to a new building she helped design in downtown El Paso. In honor of Duval Reese's 10 year anniversary as the executive director of the art museum, the Friends of the museum bought "Ellipse" by artist, Jesús Bautista Moroles and unveiled the sculpture in August 2001. Duval Reese retired from EPMA in June 2005. That same year, she was inducted into the El Paso Women's Hall of Fame in the arts category.

Selected publications

References 

Writers from El Paso, Texas
New Mexico State University alumni
American art curators
American women curators
Directors of museums in the United States
American women writers
Year of birth missing (living people)
Living people
21st-century American women